A list of films produced in the United Kingdom in 1964 (see 1964 in film):

1964

See also
1964 in British music
1964 in British radio
1964 in British television
1964 in the United Kingdom

References

External links

1964
Films
Lists of 1964 films by country or language